The Advertising Council, commonly known as the Ad Council, is an American nonprofit organization that produces, distributes, and promotes public service announcements on behalf of various sponsors, including nonprofit organizations, non-governmental organizations and agencies of the United States government.

The Ad Council partners with advertising agencies which work pro bono to create the public service advertisements on behalf of their campaigns. The organization accepts requests from sponsor institutions for advertising campaigns that focus on particular social issues. To qualify, an issue must be non-partisan (though not necessarily unbiased) and have national relevance.

The Ad Council distributes the advertisements to a network of 33,000 media outlets—including broadcast, print, outdoor (i.e. billboards, bus stops), and Internet—which run the ads in donated time and space. Media outlets donate approximately $1.8 billion to Ad Council campaigns annually. If paid for, this amount would make the Ad Council one of the largest advertisers in the country.

Beyond advertisements across broadcast, print and digital, campaign efforts often include virtual panels, coalition building, and information sharing. President and CEO Lisa Sherman has referred to an evolving model that can reach Americans through both “an air game and a ground game,” which involves direct community engagement.

In 2020, the Ad Council coordinated with partners across government, media, tech and health to disseminate messaging about social distancing, wearing masks and staying home when possible to slow the spread of the COVID-19 pandemic. In February 2021, they announced the COVID-19 Vaccine Education initiative in partnership with COVID Collaborative and more than 300 partners.

History
The organization was conceived in 1941, and it was incorporated as The Advertising Council, Inc., on February 26, 1942, On June 25, 1943, it was renamed The War Advertising Council, Inc. for the purpose of mobilizing the advertising industry in support of the war effort for the ongoing Second World War. Early campaigns encouraged enlistment to the military, the purchase of war bonds, and conservation of war materials.

Before the conclusion of World War II President Franklin D. Roosevelt requested that the Ad Council continue its work during peacetime. On February 5, 1946, The War Advertising Council officially changed its name back to The Advertising Council, Inc., and shifted its focus to issues such as atomic weapons, world trade and religious tolerance. In 1945, the Ad Council began working with the National Safety Council.

Since Roosevelt, every U.S. president has supported the Ad Council's work. In the 1950s, First Lady Eleanor Roosevelt and General Dwight D. Eisenhower appeared in the Ad Council's anti-communism ads. In the 1980s First Lady Nancy Reagan collaborated with the Ad Council on the “Just Say No” anti-drug campaign.

On March 11, 2021, as part of its COVID-19 Vaccine Education Initiative, the Ad Council released a PSA featuring former Presidents Barack Obama, George W. Bush, Bill Clinton, and Jimmy Carter along with former First Ladies Michelle Obama, Laura Bush, Hillary Clinton, and Rosalynn Carter. On March 15, the White House's official Twitter account shared the PSA with the message “Four presidents. Two political parties. One clear message: Get vaccinated when it’s available to you.”

Their partners on the initiative, COVID Collaborative, is a national assembly chaired by former Governor and U.S. Senator Dirk Kempthorne (R-ID) and former Governor Deval Patrick (D-MA).

The Ad Council's first president, Theodore Repplier, assumed leadership of the organization in 1947. Robert Keim succeeded Repplier as Ad Council president from 1966 to 1987, Ruth Wooden succeeded Keim from 1987 to 1999, and Peggy Conlon succeeded Wooden from 1999 to 2014, when the current president, Lisa Sherman, began her tenure.

Since 1986, the Ad Council's archive has been housed at the University of Illinois at Urbana-Champaign.

Famous and controversial campaigns
 Savings Bond (1942–1980) The first campaign by the then War Advertising Council encouraged Americans to support the war effort by purchasing war bonds. 
 Security of War Information—Loose Lips Sink Ships (1942–1945) The War Advertising Council's "Loose Lips Sink Ships" and "Keep It Under Your Stetson" public service ads reminded Americans to be discreet in their communication to prevent information from being leaked to the enemy during World War II.
 Wildfire Prevention (1944–present) The Ad Council's longest running campaign, Smokey Bear and his tagline, "Only You Can Prevent Forest (now Wild as of 2001) Fires", was created in 1944 to educate Americans about the harm wildfires could cause the war effort, and the danger that the Japanese might deliberately start forest fires by shelling the West Coast of the United States. It was 1947 when the iconic Smokey Bear phrase was finally coined: "Remember...only YOU can prevent forest/wild fires!" The Forest Fire Prevention campaign has helped reduce the number of acres lost annually to wildfire from 22 million to 8.4 million (in 2000).
 American Red Cross (1945–1996) The Ad Council PSAs for the American Red Cross has recruited blood donors, enlisted volunteers, and raised funds for the Red Cross for more than 50 years.
 Polio (1958–1961) PSAs for the polio vaccine helped get 80% of the at-risk populace fully immunized, eradicating the disease in the USA. 
 Crying Indian (1971–1983) This was an anti-pollution campaign for Keep America Beautiful. The iconic “Crying Indian” ad, which featured Italian-American actor Iron Eyes Cody, first aired on Earth Day in 1971. The campaign helped reduce litter by as much as 88 percent by 1983 and won two Clio Awards.
 Peace Corps (1961–1991) PSAs featuring the tagline "The Toughest Job You'll Ever Love" helped recruit thousands of volunteers to the program. In 1991, 30 percent of Peace Corps volunteers had been reached through the Ad Council's recruitment campaign.
 United Negro College Fund (1972–present) This campaign, with its slogan "A mind is a terrible thing to waste," has helped raise more than $2.2 billion and helped to graduate more than 400,000 minority students from college or beyond.
 McGruff (1979–present) This campaign's slogan is "Take a bite out of crime" for the National Crime Prevention Council (in conjunction with the U.S. Department of Justice). It was created in 1978.
 Drunk Driving Prevention (1983–present) This campaign is intended to reduce the number of DUI accidents and alcohol-related fatalities, this campaign with the U.S. Department of Transportation has featured the taglines: "Drinking & Driving Can Kill A Friendship", "Friends Don't Let Friends Drive Drunk" and "Buzzed Driving is Drunk Driving".
 Vince and Larry, the Crash Test Dummies (1985–present) This is a campaign about safety belts. Since the introduction of this campaign, safety belt usage has increased from 14% to 79%, saving an estimated 85,000 lives, and $3.2 billion in costs to society.
 AIDS Prevention (1988–1990) This Ad Council ad campaign was the first to use the word "condom" in America. The PSAs informed Americans of the dangers of the HIV and encouraged them to "Help stop AIDS. Use a condom." 
 Domestic Violence (1994–present) The PSAs encourage people to get involved in efforts to prevent domestic violence and to intervene if they know someone in an abusive relationship. In the first year of the campaign, more than 34,000 calls were made to the Family Violence Prevention hotline. 
 I am an American (2001–present) a campaign launched in wake of the September 11, 2001 terrorist attacks emphasizing the diversity of America. The ad features people of many ethnicities looking in the camera and simply saying "I am an American". A slightly updated version of the ad was shown in 2011, during the 10th anniversary of the attacks.
 Adoption from Foster Care (2004–present) This campaign delivers the message that "You don't have to be perfect to be a perfect parent." Since the beginning of the campaign, more than 14,000 families have registered to adopt kids through the campaign Web site AdoptUSKids.org.  
 Autism Awareness (2006–present) The PSAs encourage parents to visit autismspeaks.org/signs to learn the signs of autism and to find out about early intervention. The campaign won an Effie Award for advertising effectiveness in 2008, a Silver Telly in 2009, a Silver Addy and Gold Ogilvy in 2011. 
 Gay and Lesbian Bullying Prevention (2008–present) GLSEN and Ad Council launched the first campaign to address anti-gay language among teens. PSAs feature celebrities such as Wanda Sykes, Grant Hill and Hilary Duff and ask kids to stop using homophobic language such as "That's so gay." 
 Fatherhood Involvement (2008–present) PSAs featuring the tagline "Take time to be a dad today" encourage fathers to play an active role in their children's lives. The campaign's “Cheerleader” PSA is one of the Ad Council's most popular PSAs and has earned $9.7 million in donated media since 2008. 
 FWD campaign with USAID (2011–present) In September 2011, Ad Council and United States Agency for International Development (USAID) launched the FWD campaign to spread awareness about famine, war and drought in the Horn of Africa. The initiative garnered the participation of  celebrities like Uma Thurman, Geena Davis, Josh Hartnett, Chanel Iman and Anthony Bourdain who starred in Public Service Announcements that asked the public to "forward the facts" about the crisis.
 Love Has No Labels (2015–present). Ad Council's Emmy-winning diversity and inclusion campaign aims to promote diversity across race, gender, age, sexual orientation and ability. Its video was among the 10 most watched videos on YouTube in 2015. The commercial for the campaign won the award for Best Commercial during at the 2016 Emmy Awards. In June 2020, the campaign released “Fight for Freedom” to support the ongoing fight for racial justice for the Black community. The next month, it released “Fight the Virus. Fight the Bias” in response to the rise of anti-Asian racism during COVID-19.
 Seize the Awkward (2018–present). Launched in partnership with the American Foundation for Suicide Prevention and the JED Foundation, this campaign empowers young adults to talk to each other about mental health. In 2020, the campaign received the Shorty Award for Best Use of a Spokesperson for its partnership with Billie Eilish. The same year, the campaign expanded to address mental health issues exacerbated by the COVID-19 pandemic. 
 COVID-19 Response (2020–present). Less than a week after the World Health Organization declared COVID-19 a global pandemic, the Ad Council announced a collaboration with the White House, Centers for Disease Control and Prevention (CDC), U.S. Department of Health and Human Services (HHS), and major media networks to launch a series of national public service ads and multi-channel content to provide critical and urgent messages to the American public. As the pandemic unfolded, the campaign continued to create work encouraging Americans to socially distance, wear masks and stay home when possible to slow the spread of the pandemic. As part of the campaign's response to the pandemic's disproportionate impact on the Black community, “You Will See Me” ads featured Viola Davis, Simone Biles, and Questlove. Ad Age noted the ads “[encourage] people to stay safe while also elevating the voices of the individuals behind the masks.” 
 COVID-19 Vaccine Education Initiative (2021–present). On February 25, 2021, the Ad Council and COVID Collaborative launched the COVID-19 Vaccine Education Initiative with more than 300 founding partners. The initiative involved multiple campaigns designed to reach multiple communities with the facts about the vaccines. In April, a cover story on the initiative in Washington Post Magazine explored the strategy behind “one of the biggest, most difficult public service campaigns in U.S. history.” Former Presidents Barack Obama, George W. Bush, Bill Clinton, and Jimmy Carter appeared in a PSA for the initiative along with former First Ladies Michelle Obama, Laura Bush, Hillary Clinton and Rosalynn Carter. Pope Francis also appeared in a PSA along with six cardinals and archbishops from North, Central and South America, saying that getting vaccinated against COVID-19 was “an act of love.”

Organizations with campaigns done by the Ad Council
AARP
Agency for Healthcare Research and Quality
American Cancer Society
American Foundation for AIDS Research
American Heart Association
American Red Cross
AmeriCorps VISTA
Arthritis Foundation
Autism Speaks
Afterschool Alliance
Bedsider
Big Brothers Big Sisters of America
Dollar General Literacy Foundation
Family Violence Prevention Fund
Give Kids The World Village
The Henry J. Kaiser Family Foundation 
Keep America Beautiful
Maternal & Child Health Bureau
National AIDS Network
National Crime Prevention Council
National Fatherhood Initiative
National Center for Family Literacy
National Urban Coalition
Peace Corps
Save the Children
United Negro College Fund
United States Army
United States Department of Agriculture
United States Department of Health and Human Services
United States Department of Justice
United States Department of Transportation
United States Forest Service
United States Olympic Committee
USA Freedom Corps
WIC (Special Supplemental Nutrition Program for Women, Infants and Children)

Partnerships with film production companies
Several recent Ad Council PSA campaigns have involved partnerships with film production companies, including Warner Bros., Sony Pictures Entertainment, and Disney. Examples include a partnership with Warner Bros. featuring characters from Where the Wild Things Are in PSAs to counteract childhood obesity, PSAs for child passenger safety featuring clips from Warner Bros. The Wizard of Oz, a partnership with Sony Pictures Entertainment's The Smurfs 2 to encourage children to explore nature.

Criticism
Due to the Ad Council's historically close collaboration with the President of the United States and the federal government, it has been labeled by historian Robert Griffith as "little more than a domestic propaganda arm of the federal government."

Environmental activist Mike Ewall has criticized the Ad Council for what he believes is distracting the public by focusing on individual lifestyle changes, rather than on the perceived need to fix social problems by changing institutions, such as the Ad Council's many corporate sponsors, or the government and military, whose campaigns the Ad Council has also promoted.

Ad Council spots, like other public service announcements, are often used to fill unsold air time by talk radio stations on the local or nationally syndicated level. Activists unfamiliar with the radio advertising model have complained to the Ad Council itself, or affiliated groups such as AARP, about Ad Council spots airing on controversial radio programs. The Ad Council and related groups responded by announcing they do not necessarily share the views of the host stations or programs where their announcements air.

See also
Ad Council Japan
Educational advertisement

Notes and references

External links
The Advertising Council official website
Advertising Council archives at University of Illinois 
Guide to collections containing information on the Advertising Council at the Eisenhower Presidential Library 

Advertising organizations
Non-profit organizations based in Washington, D.C.
Public service announcement organizations
Organizations established in 1942
Propaganda in the United States
1942 establishments in the United States